The Governor's Cup is an annual award given to the winner of the most games between Alaska and Alaska Anchorage during each season.

The Governor's Cup was first awarded in 1994 as a way to continue the rivalry between the two Division I programs despite being in separate conferences.

The Cup is awarded to whichever team finishes the season with a better record. If there is a tie at the end of the season the two teams hold a shootout to decide the champion.

The series was sponsored by Nissan for the first four years and then Alaska Airlines since 1998.

Governor's Cup Results

 † Alaska's titles in 2010, 2011 and 2012 were vacated as a result of NCAA violations..

All-Time Results

References

External links

College ice hockey tournaments in the United States
Alaska Nanooks ice hockey
Alaska Anchorage Seawolves men's ice hockey
Sports in Alaska